Goan Bogame is an archaeological site in the eastern Sool region of Somaliland.

Overview
Goan Bogame is situated in the Las Anod District, near Gubyaley. It contains the ruins of a large ancient city with around two hundred buildings. The structures were built in an architectural style similar to that of the edifices in Mogadishu's old Hamar Weine and Shangani districts.

See also
Somali architecture

Notes

Archaeological sites in Somaliland
Sool, Somaliland